Volodymyr Viktorovych Zayimenko (born 18 April 1997) is a Ukrainian professional footballer who plays as a centre-back for Ukrainian club Kryvbas Kryvyi Rih.

References

External links
 Profile on Kryvbas Kryvyi Rih official website
 
 

1997 births
Living people
Piddubny Olympic College alumni
Ukrainian footballers
Sportspeople from Kryvyi Rih
Association football defenders
FC Hirnyk Kryvyi Rih players
FC Kryvbas Kryvyi Rih players
Ukrainian First League players
Ukrainian Second League players